Leo M. Tilman (born 1971) is an American financier, author, and a leading authority on strategy, risk intelligence, and finance. He currently serves as the president and CEO of Tilman & Company, a global strategic advisory firm. Tilman was formerly an executive at BlackRock, Capitol Peak, 
and Bear Stearns and adjunct professor of finance at Columbia University.

Tilman is credited with predicting the financial crisis of 2007–2008 by showing the unsustainable nature of global imbalances in his book Financial Darwinism. His latest book Agility: How to Navigate the Unknown and Seize Opportunity in a World of Disruption (2019), co-authored with former NORAD Commander General Charles H. Jacoby Jr., presents a comprehensive theory of agility and a practical roadmap to fostering agility at any organization. The book's urgent call for action—that leaders must learn how to consistently navigate radical disruption and uncertainty—foreshadowed the COVID pandemic, global economic recession, and social turmoil of 2020.

Tilman is the author of two prior books on risk management and finance and other notable publications. In collaboration with Nobel Laureate Edmund Phelps, he co-authored a 2010 Harvard Business Review proposal to create the First National Bank of Innovation  in order to enhance U.S. economic dynamism. In a 2012 European Financial Review article, he redefined risk intelligence and designated it "new essential competence" for companies and investors who aspire to create lasting value for stakeholders and society. He is the creator of the Corporate Risk Scorecard, a holistic view of a company's business model and risk profile similar to a food Nutrition Label (Barrons) and co-author of the pioneering "Brain as a Business Model" framework 
(European Financial Review, 2014).

Tilman was one of the main architects of a public/private partnership involving the White House Rural Council, U.S. Department of Agriculture, and the Farm Credit System that brought billions of private capital to innovative companies and projects.

Tilman was profiled as a "Business Visionary" by Forbes among "influential authors, decision makers, and thought leaders in the field of business" and named Young Global Leader of the World Economic Forum for "professional accomplishments, commitment to society and potential to contribute to shaping the future of the world."

Education and early career

Tilman received B.A. and M.A. in mathematics from Columbia University and executive education at the Kennedy School of Government at Harvard University and the Jackson Institute for Global Affairs at Yale University. Before founding Capitol Peak and Tilman & Company, Tilman was Chief Institutional Strategist and Senior Managing Director at Bear Stearns. He started his career at BlackRock.

Current appointments
 President & CEO, Tilman & Company
 Member, Colorado Forum
 Trustee, Denver Museum of Nature and Science
 Advisory Board Member, Center on Capitalism and Society, Columbia University

Former appointments
 Board Member, Atlantic Partnership
 Board Member, Drake Management
 Chairman, Capitol Peak Asset Management
 Adjunct Professor, Columbia University
 International Advisory Board Member, British American Business
 Contributing Editor, The Journal of Risk Finance

Selected bibliography

Articles
The most agile day - strategy+business 
Wanted: A First National Bank of Innovation - Harvard Business Review
Risk Intelligence: A Bedrock of Dynamism and Lasting Value Creation - European Financial Review
Taming Risk In a Volatile World - Directorship
The New Risk Paradigm for Corporate Governance - Chief Executive
"Wanted: A Corporate Risk Scorecard – Barron's" - Barrons
"Brain as a Business Model" - European Financial Review

Books
Risk Management
Asset Liability Management
Financial Darwinism
Agility

Agility

"Agility is the most decisive factor in successfully navigating the Fourth Industrial Revolution and fulfilling its promise to humankind. In this important and compelling book, Tilman and Jacoby provide a comprehensive theory of agility and a practical guide to developing and leading agile organizations." – Klaus Schwab, Founder & Executive Chairman, World Economic Forum

In a world of accelerating disruption and staggering uncertainty, agile organizations that can assess and respond to change in real time gain an aggressive edge over competitors in the market. Agility has become a tenet of business success in the disruptive age—but most leaders still don't know what it truly means and are in need of specific guidance on what it takes to build organizations that are consistently agile.

Agility is a choice followed by action and hard work. It requires specific experience, understanding, and commitment. It demands engagement across the organization as well as a concerted investment in people and processes. Adopting the agility mindset allows organizations to thrive since it provides a new way of studying environments, making decisions, evaluating threats and opportunities, building cultures and relationships, defining True North (strategic and moral), and decisively executing. First, leaders must fully understand and embrace what agility means. Then they and their subordinates must be trained. It is through that shared understanding, training, and practice that the agility mindset is created.

Agility, written by Tilman and General Charles H. Jacoby Jr., presents a call to action for leaders across public and private sectors that agility is urgently needed and that it is achievable for any organization. When organizations make the choice to become agile, adopt the agility mindset, and acquire the requisite knowledge and capabilities—all while remaining vigilant—agility becomes their enduring state of being. Agility is far superior, and far more effective than mere speed and adaptability. Organizations that adopt this mindset thrive amidst uncertainty and disruption, and are able to turn today's challenging environment into an advantage—one that supports their vision.

Financial Darwinism
"Financial Darwinism explains the tectonic shifts now underway in the investment world far better than any book I have seen to date," writes David M. Rubenstein, co-founder of The Carlyle Group. "Those who are interested in really understanding how financial markets have dramatically changed in the past few years – and how they are likely to change again in the next few years – would do well to read and absorb this important work by Leo Tilman."

Tilman's Financial Darwinism is based on the premise that today's complex economic and financial landscape requires executives, financial professionals, regulators, policy makers, and investors to adopt a radically new way of thinking and making decisions. Global systemic financial crises, periodic astonishing losses, and ruin of once-venerable institutions serve as convincing evidence on what happens otherwise, necessitating a road map to the new financial order and an essential guide to adapting and succeeding in it.

Financial Darwinism analyzes the dominant global forces behind the tectonic financial shift that has taken place in finance of the past quarter century and then comprehensively explores the challenges facing financial institutions as well as the universe of their potential responses. Conceptually, it consists of two highly interrelated parts. The first one is the evolutionary thesis called Dynamic Finance. This thesis explains the origins and drivers of the profound changes in the global financial system. Tilman proposes that the basic key to understanding the behavior of modern financial institutions and capital markets lies in the recognition of the fact that the process of economic value creation in finance has undergone a fundamental transformation. More specifically, due to significant margin pressures on basic financial businesses, active risk taking has begun to play an increasingly dominant role how financial institutions create (and destroy) shareholder value. In order to demonstrate this, the book introduces the concept of risk-based economic performance that helps depart from the outdated accounting-earnings-inspired mental paradigm. Throughout, the dynamism of risk-taking and business decisions is emphasized as a distinguishing characteristic of the dynamic new world vis-à-vis the old financial regime.

Managing modern financial institutions is a task of enormous uncertainty, scope and complexity. Thus, the second part of this book uses this evolutionary perspective to introduce an actionable decision-making framework designed to help financial executives respond the ongoing challenges. Together, the decision-making framework, the evolutionary thesis, and the risk-based economic performance equation filter out the complexity of the financial world and give financial executives a set of tools and choices on how to create or enhance economic value. They help define financial institutions' strategic vision that properly integrates customer-related and risk-taking decisions, thus unifying business strategy, corporate finance, investment analysis, and risk management. Lastly, they help determine an "optimal" way to implement the strategic vision using the entire arsenal of advanced financial tools. In the process, risk management naturally becomes the very language of strategic decisions.

Financial Darwinism which, in essence, is a prelude to risk intelligence, help financial institutions and investors deliver sustainable economic performance amidst complex, uncertain, and constantly evolving business and market environments.

References

External links

1971 births
American financiers
Living people